Valle de la Pascua Airport  is an airport serving Valle de la Pascua, a city in the state of Guárico in central Venezuela.

The Valle De La Pascua VOR-DME (Ident: VPA) is located on the field.

The airport has aviation fuel Jet A1 on site. Its single runway has no lights, therefore it only operates from sunrise to sunset.

See also
Transport in Venezuela
List of airports in Venezuela

References

External links
OurAirports - Valle de la Pascua
SkyVector - Valle de la Pascua
OpenStreetMap - Valle de la Pascua

Airports in Venezuela
Buildings and structures in Guárico
Buildings and structures in Valle de la Pascua